Sant'Andrea is a Neoclassic church in Bergamo, rebuilt by Ferdinando Crivelli in 1837.  On the main altar, is Enthroned Madonna with child and Saints Eusebius, Andrew, Domno, and Domneone, painted in 1536-7 by Il Moretto and a Nativity by Giovanni Paolo Cavagna. Other paintings here are by Palma il Giovane, Enea Salmeggia, Giovanni Giacomo Barbelli, Padovanino,  a ‘’Deposition’’ by Andrea Previtali, and others.

Bibliography
Pier Virgilio Begni Redona, Alessandro Bonvicino - Il Moretto da Brescia, Editrice La Scuola, Brescia 1988

Andrea
Churches completed in 1837
Neoclassical architecture in Lombardy
19th-century Roman Catholic church buildings in Italy
Neoclassical church buildings in Italy